The Bosnian ambassador in Washington, D.C. is the official representative of the Bosnian government in Sarajevo to the government of the United States.

List of representatives

This section lists the ambassadors of Bosnia and Herzegovina to the United States since the country's Embassy opened on August 1, 1992. Since its opening, seven people have served as ambassador, five men and two women.

The first ambassador was Sven Alkalaj, designated on April 5 and appointed on June 23, 1994, and served as ambassador until June 14, 2000. He would later on become a prominent diplomat, serve as Bosnia and Herzegovina's Minister of Foreign Affairs and as the country's Permanent Representative to the United Nations.

The first women as ambassador was Bisera Turković, designated on August 10 and appointed on October 3, 2005, serving until May 20, 2009. Since 2019, like Alkalaj, has been serving as Minister of Foreign Affairs.

The current ambassador is Bojan Vujić, a former professional tennis player, appointed on September 16, 2019.

References

 
United States
Bosnia and Herzegovina